Hollyoaks is a British television soap opera that was first broadcast on 23 October 1995. The following is a list of characters that first appear in the show in 2021, by order of first appearance. All characters are introduced by the show's executive producer Bryan Kirkwood, or by his successor, Lucy Allan. Brad King (Tom Benedict Knight) made his debut in January as the boyfriend of Trish Minniver (Denise Welch). Shaq Qureshi (Omar Malik), the step-cousin of Sami Maalik (Rishi Nair), made his first appearance in March, as well as Fergus Collins (Robert Beck). AJ and Curtis Pritchard also made guest appearances as Marco and Jacob, respectively. Timmy Simons (Sam Tutty) debuted in June as somebody working for Fergus. July saw the arrival of Becky Quentin (Katie McGlynn), a friend of Diane Hutchinson (Alex Fletcher). Cathy Shipton joined the cast in August as Lydia Smith, the aunt of Luke Morgan (Gary Lucy). She was followed by Ali Shahzad (Raji James), the father of Shaq. After Allan's episodes began airing, she announced her plans to introduce numerous black characters to the series. These include Nate Denby, now Saul Reeves (Chris Charles), Olivia Bradshaw (Emily Burnett), Pearl Anderson (Dawn Hope) and DeMarcus Westwood (Tomi Ade). In October, Natalie Anderson joined the soap as police detective Lexi Calder and Serena Chen-Williams joined the soap as a love interest for Sid Sumner (Billy Price). In November, Ethan Williams (Matthew James-Bailey) and his girlfriend Maya Harkwell (Ky Discala) debuted as part of a storyline where the pair kidnap Darren Osborne (Ashley Taylor Dawson). In December, Serena's family, the Chen-Williams, are introduced and became the first East Asian family in a soap opera. The family includes Honour (Vera Chok) and her husband Dave (Dominic Power), as well as their children, Sam Chen-Williams (Matthew McGivern), Lizzie Chen-Williams (Lily Best) and Mason Chen-Williams (Frank Kauer). Additionally, multiple other characters appear throughout the year.

Brad King

Brad King, played by Tom Benedict Knight, made his first appearance in episode 5506, originally broadcast on 18 January 2021. The casting was announced on 5 January 2021, while Denise Welch teased the character in an interview on 11 November 2020. Brad is the boyfriend of Trish Minniver (Welch) and will accompany her into the village when she returns. Brad's appearance will come as a shock to Trish's daughter, Maxine Minniver (Nikki Sanderson). Brad has been described as both handsome and manipulative.

Speaking about his casting, Knight said: "I am really thrilled and excited to have joined the Hollyoaks family. It has been awesome on set, fast-paced, and never a dull moment working with the great cast and crew. Working with Denise and Nikki has been absolutely fantastic, both are super talented actors who are a delight to work with, and have had me in stitches non-stop! Brad is definitely here to stir things up in Hollyoaks... Get ready for a lot of bad behaviour and broken hearts. There's a new BAD boy in the village..."

Shaq Qureshi

Shaq Qureshi, played by Omar Malik, made his first appearance on 8 March 2021. Shaq is introduced as the step-cousin of established character Sami Maalik (Rishi Nair). Justin Harp of Digital Spy wrote that Shaq will have a "memorable entrance in the village" when he arrives in a wedding Sherwani after ditching his bride at the altar. Harp noted that the "charming and cunning" character will have make many characters in the village "swoon". He hinted that Shaq may be "key" in helping Sami to realise his girlfriend Verity Hutchinson (Eva O'Hara) is pretending to be pregnant, and noted that their reunion will be "chaotic". Malik voiced his joy to be joining Hollyoaks, and especially being part of the Maalik family unit. He stated that he is excited to be "bringing energy, charm and mischief to the Hollyoaks village". He commended his co-stars and crew members, whom he noted "went above and beyond to make me feel comfortable and relaxed", and that he loves working on Hollyoaks due to the "proper family vibe". Malik added: "I hope everyone enjoys watching Shaq, just as much as I enjoy playing him!"

Talking about his character, Malik explained that Shaq "thrives on danger" but that he is vulnerable and has "bitten off more than he can chew". He adds: "Underneath the confident and cool exterior, there's a delicate fragility that slowly glimmers the more you get to know him" and hinted that Shaq has secrets which will be explored in the future. He explained that the backstory of Shaq involves him having been in trouble and "bringing shame on his family", meaning he is considered a "liability" by his relatives. He pressures him to "make something of himself and prove everyone wrong". Malik notes that people in the village begin to realise that "there's more brewing behind Shaq's cheeky smile", and that he "catches the eye" of an unnamed McQueen woman. Malik opined that his character enjoys to socialise with women, and that although he enjoys "playing the field", he is a "gentleman at heart", and voiced his wishes for a love interest to "tame his wild and flirtatious spirit". Speaking about filming with the "mystery McQueen", Malik stated, without giving details on the actress or character, that he enjoys working with her. Due to joining Hollyoaks during the COVID-19 pandemic, Malik was unable to meet all of his co-stars in person, and had to use Zoom in order to communicate with the cast members. Despite this, he labelled it "a dream come true" to join the soap, and recalled memories from his childhood where he would watch the soap after school, adding that his younger relatives are "avid fans" of Hollyoaks. On 20 January 2023, it was confirmed that Malik was exiting the role. Shaq’s final scenes aired on 24 January 2023.

After initially being introduced as the nephew of Misbah Maalik (Harvey Virdi), he later learns that he is her son and that his father is Ali Shahzad (Raji James). He forms a connection with Ali until Misbah reveals that Ali raped her. Malik felt that his character wanted a dad badly and felt that Ali wanted a relationship with his son, but only for the purpose of manipulating him. On the revelation, Malik said that Shaq is broken and feels that he no longer knows himself. He described Shaq's journey as "a rollercoaster of emotions" ranging from anger and sadness to fragility. Following a brutal attack on Ali, Malik opined that his character is capable of attacking him. Malik explained: "If he's pushed into a corner, he's willing to do anything. At one point, Shaq says to Yazz, 'If I see Ali, I'll kill him!' He's put it out there, and I think he's willing to do it. So yes, he's very capable of hurting his dad."

Fergus Collins

Fergus Collins, played by Robert Beck, made his first appearance on 17 March 2021. The character and casting was announced on 9 March 2021. Fergus is the ex-boyfriend of Trish Minniver (Denise Welch) and a former business partner of Trish's current boyfriend Brad King (Benedict Knight). Fergus arrives in the village with a new business proposition for Brad, however, his old feelings for Trish resurface.

Beck voiced his joy at appearing on a soap again, having previously appeared in Brookside, which was filmed in the same studio as Hollyoaks. Speaking about joining Hollyoaks, Beck said: "I'm over the moon to be given this opportunity. I couldn't really feel more at home, especially having started my career here with Brookside. Everyone has been so welcoming, including many old faces who were around in my Brookie days. Working with Denise and Nikki [Sanderson, aka Maxine] is great – I know them both and they've really helped me settle in." Teasing his character a bit, the actor said: "Fergus is a lovely character to play... He's cheeky, but he's a man you really wouldn't want as an enemy, and to be honest, you would probably have to be pretty careful if he was your friend..."

After promotional photos of Fergus were released, viewers speculated that he would be a villain based on his appearance. Beck confirmed viewers' comments, commenting that Fergus is "a bit dodgy", and "a shady businessman who likes to meddle, and delights in others' discomfort." He went on state: "Fergus is the type of person who'll walk into a room, drop a bombshell, and take great pleasure in watching people react!" Following the release of Hollyoaks spring trailer, a scene depicted Fergus spying on young couple Juliet Nightingale (Niamh Blackshaw) and Peri Lomax (Ruby O'Donnell) with a camera planted in their bedroom. Digital Spy confirmed that he is a villain and wrote that Juliet and Peri may be in danger.

Scenes later explore Fergus' side business, an operation he names Bluebird. The operation involves the installation of cameras disguised as alarms in women's bedrooms in order to film them for Fergus' live-streaming website. People pay to watch the women being filmed without their permission. He employs Timmy Simons (Sam Tutty) to help him with the technological aspect of the business. Timmy forms an obsession with Peri and later informs her and Juliet of the cameras in their bedroom; in order to keep the truth emerging about Bluebird, Fergus shoots him dead and has Warren Fox (Jamie Lomas) bury his body with him. Fergus closes down the live-streaming website to avoid further trouble and as a result of the feed going down, a subscriber messages him and offers to pay him £1 million to buy Maxine, who he had watched on Fergus' website. He agrees to the offer and arranges for Maxine to be trafficked; when the trafficking is discovered by the police, he lies to the police by framing Warren. Maxine and Trish later realise the truth and Trish confronts him on his crimes whilst wearing a police informant wire. He realises that he is being recorded and goes to kill Trish, until Maxine strikes him over the head with a champagne bottle, leaving him dead.

Marco
Marco, played by AJ Pritchard made his first appearance on 29 March 2021. The casting was announced on 7 February 2021, while the character's name was announced on 23 March 2021. Marco and his twin brother Jacob, played by AJ's real-life brother Curtis, will be rivals to dance teacher Trish Minniver (Denise Welch). Speaking about their characters and casting, Pritchard said: "I can't believe we will be featuring on Hollyoaks, we have grown up with the show on TV and it's always been one of our favourite serial dramas. Our characters are fantastic, and we can’t wait for everyone to see how we bring them to life." Pritchard described Marco as cheeky and confident, and claimed that Marco "knows what he wants". He added that upon his character's arrival, he "acts as if he owns the place".

Following his debut scenes airing, Pritchard's acting capabilities received criticism from viewers. Hayley Parker of The Sentinel wrote that fans of the soap did not give him "the best reception", with his performance being described as "robotic and wooden". Viewers claimed that their own acting skills were better than Pritchard's, describing him as "cringe," and that his episode was one of the worst Hollyoaks episodes to be aired, demanding for the dance school storyline to be scrapped. Following social media users posting clips of the Pritchard brothers' scenes, they went viral and were the subject of widespread jokes, criticism and negativity. Former Hollyoaks cast member Gerard McCarthy commented on the scenes, stating that casting directors should not cast people purely for having a large social media following. Speaking to OK! about the viral criticism himself and his brother were facing, Pritchard stated: "If someone's got constructive criticism, 100 per cent that's great, but if it's just negativity then it's not something I'm going to waste my energy and time on that. It was really good to learn off all the professionals. I loved it, it was great."

Jacob
Jacob, played by Curtis Pritchard, made his first appearance on 7 May 2021. The casting was announced on 7 February 2021, while the character's name was announced on 27 April 2021. Jacob and his twin brother, Marco, who will be played by Curtis' real-life brother, AJ, will be rivals to dance teacher Trish Minniver (Denise Welch). Speaking about their characters casting, Pritchard said: "I am so excited to be working with my brother AJ on a show we grew up watching! I am also excited to continue our journey together with Channel 4 and E4."

Following social media users posting clips of the Pritchard brothers' scenes, they went viral and were the subject of widespread jokes, criticism and negativity. Former Hollyaks cast member Gerard McCarthy commented on the scenes, stating that casting directors should not cast people purely for having a large social media following. Speaking to OK! about the viral criticism himself and his brother were facing, Pritchard stated: "Up to this moment I felt absolutely nothing about it because I hadn't realised anybody had said anything. We always get that, we always get different things and for me it's always about positivity."

Timmy Simons
Timmy Simons, played by Sam Tutty, made his first appearance on 3 June 2021. Timmy is introduced as a "computer wizard" hired by Fergus Collins (Robert Beck) to look after the technical side of his secret operation that films teenage girls in their bedrooms. Justin Harp of Digital Spy wrote that on the surface, Timmy seems like a regular character, but that in time, viewers will see he is "not someone to be easily underestimated". On his casting, Tutty said: "working at Hollyoaks is an absolute delight. Everyone has been so welcoming and have been very supportive whenever I have had any questions." He gave an ode to Beck, whose character is Timmy's "terrifying overseer". Tutty stated that he felt privileged to play a character like Timmy due to his "poisoned moral compass [which] has led him down a treacherous path".

Timmy forms an obsession with Peri Lomax (Ruby O'Donnell) and he becomes determined to anonymously ruin her relationship with her girlfriend Juliet Nightingale (Niamh Blackshaw), as he feels that Juliet does not deserve her. Juliet discovers what he has been doing to ruin her relationship and tries to tell Peri, but Timmy manipulates Peri into thinking she is deluded. He then pushes Juliet down a flight of steps and holds Peri hostage in her home. She realises that he has been stalking her for months and watching her from the camera installed in her bedroom. They get a confession on tape and plan to go the police; however, when Fergus discovers that Timmy could get him into trouble, he shoots and kills him. Tutty was sad to leave the show as he enjoyed the working environment and he felt that there was a lot more to be discovered about Timmy, but he could not stay on the soap for a longer tenure due to appearing in Dear Evan Hansen. He also knew that Timmy would only feature on the soap for a number of months due to his forthcoming theatre appearance. When asked if he would have liked Timmy to be redeemed, he replied: "I would have loved to have played Timmy for another year or so. I think turning over a new leaf was something he was capable of. But it's whether Fergus would have allowed him to do that." Tutty revealed that Timmy's death was filmed in various different ways and that prior to the scenes airing, he was not aware of which ending they would air. Tutty felt that Fergus was the right option to take Timmy out due to knowing him the most out of the villagers. Tutty admitted that he was apprehensive about playing a villain, especially since he had not acted on television before. He accredited the crew of Hollyoaks for guiding his choices and felt that they were accommodating to his unsureness. He also accredited Blackshaw and O'Donnell, who he formed friendships with whilst appearing on the soap. Tutty was glad to see Juliet and Peri get their revenge on Timmy in his final episode and described the scenes as fun; he admitted that fans of their relationship did not receive Timmy well, adding: "As soon as you compromise 'Jeri' and their ship, you are immediately on the chopping block – which I totally accepted and was hoping for, really. I didn't want Timmy to be well-received, because that wouldn't really bode well for Peri and Juliet!"

Becky Quentin
Becky Quentin, played by Katie McGlynn, made her first appearance on 6 July 2021. Becky is a new mother who grows close to Diane Hutchinson (Alex Fletcher) as they swap stories about motherhood, however Digital Spy's Emily Hutchinson teased that Becky could have ulterior motives. Becky departed on 16 February 2022.

Speaking about her character, McGlynn said: "When I first read the script, I knew instantly that this storyline was an important one, and something that I could really sink my teeth into. I'm so excited for everyone to meet Becky and am thrilled to be working alongside the amazing cast and crew of Hollyoaks." She added she was "hopeful the story will have an impact on the viewers as it covers some extremely current and important issues," and that she was "super humbled" to continue working.

Lydia Smith
Lydia Smith, played by Cathy Shipton, made her first appearance on 30 August 2021. Her casting and character details were announced on 20 August 2021. Lydia is the aunt of Luke Morgan (Gary Lucy) and Zara Morgan (Kelly Greenwood) and arrives in the village following the death of their mother Sue Morgan (Marian McLoughlin). Lydia will arrive in the village after her husband, and Luke and Zara's uncle, dies from FTD Pick's disease, the same condition Luke is suffering from, and will give Cindy Cunningham (Stephanie Waring) advice about living with someone with the condition.

Ali Shahzad
Ali Shahzad, played by Raji James, made his first appearance on 3 September 2021. The character and casting was announced on 23 August 2021. Ali is the father of Shaq Qureshi (Omar Malik) and becomes a new hire at the Dee Valley Hospital. The character was described as someone who is able to win others over with his charm and professionalism, but someone who is hiding dark secrets.

Speaking about his casting, James said: "I'm delighted to be joining the cast of Hollyoaks, particularly as I'm part of a very topical and potentially explosive storyline. Ali is a very complex character and I'm thoroughly enjoying the opportunity to explore his darker side. Due to the COVID rules in place, I've only been able to meet a few of the other cast members so far, they, along with the incredible crew and office staff, have all been very welcoming and supportive, making it easy to fit in. Having hit the ground running, we've already filmed a few hugely emotional scenes. It's been an absolute pleasure to work alongside and learn from such fantastic actors as Harvey Virdi (Misbah), Omar Malik (Shaq), Sarah Jayne Dunn (Mandy), Lysette Anthony (Marnie) and Nadine Mulkerrin (Cleo)."

Saul Reeves
Saul Reeves, also Nate Denby, played by Chris Charles, made his first appearance on 7 September 2021. Saul is a new stallholder at the Cunningham's Grand Bazaar and becomes a roommate to Grace Black (Tamara Wall) and Ripley Lennox (Ki Griffin). Although Saul quickly bonds with the pair, the situation become complicated when he develops feelings for Grace. It has been teased though that Saul may not be someone who can be trusted.

Speaking of his casting, Charles said: "I'm absolutely thrilled and honoured to be joining such a legendary show and staple in British television. Words can't describe how blessed I feel or the level of excitement I have to get started and bring Nate to the village for all of our amazing audience. Let the drama begin!"

It is later revealed that Saul is an undercover police officer who has been going under the name, Nate Denby, hired to bring down Fergus Collins' (Robert Beck) illegal operation known as Bluebird, but that he has gone rogue on his own private mission to track down Lisa Loveday (Rachel Adedeji), who unbeknownst to him was murdered by Toby Faroe (Bobby Gordon). In an interview with Inside Soap, Charles said that the viewer reaction to his character has been mixed, with many suspicious of him at the beginning of his tenure. However, following the reveal that he is an undercover police officer, he said that the feedback had been positive. The actor was asked if Saul's feelings for Grace were real or faked for the mission, to which he confirmed that Saul does have true feelings for Grace despite their relationship initially being formed as part of his plan. He was also asked what Saul's reaction to discovering the truth about Lisa's murder would be. Charles affirmed that Saul would not result to violence and would rather keep it "in the parameters of the law", despite Saul and the Deveraux family being on "a collision course".

Olivia Bradshaw
Olivia Bradshaw, played by Emily Burnett, made her first appearance on 9 September 2021. Her casting and character details were announced on 6 July 2021, where it was confirmed that she would be introduced as part of Prince McQueen's (Malique Thompson-Dwyer) return storyline. Olivia becomes a staff member at Hollyoaks High. Upon the announcement of her casting, Burnett stated that she is having a lot of fun working with Thompson-Dwyer and Chelsee Healey, who portrays Prince's mother Goldie McQueen. Burnett also hoped her character would be considered a part of the McQueen family one day. Burnett described Olivia as "classy, very sassy" and someone that knows what she wants. Burnett also said that her character is "probably someone you don't want to get on the wrong side of" but noted that she has a good heart, especially concerning Prince. Hollyoaks confirmed that Olivia will cause a stir with the McQueen family due to her "self-assuredness and fondness for the finer things in life". It was confirmed on 19 December 2022 that Burnett would be departing from Hollyoaks. Olivia's final scenes aired on 29 December 2022.

Pearl Anderson
Pearl Anderson, played by Dawn Hope, made her first appearance on 10 September 2021. Her casting was announced on 17 August 2021 and it was confirmed that she would be introduced as a figure from Walter Deveraux's (Trevor A. Toussaint) past. It was stated that Pearl is a friend of his dead wife Gloria and the Deveraux family in general. Pearl's intention for coming to the village is to catch up with the Deveraux family and to reminisce about her memories with Gloria. Digital Spy's Justin Harp wrote that Pearl's presence could help Walter to recover from his health struggles and being the victim of a robbery, hinting that their bond may become more than friendship. On her casting, Hope said that she was thrilled to be joining the cast of Hollyoaks and voiced her excitement to be playing Pearl, who she described as fun-loving, vibrant and stylish. Writing for the Metro, Stephen Patterson described Pearl as a gregarious and forthright character who "brings a welcomed warmth to those around her". Patterson also noted that Pearl is an adventurous woman who refuses to slow down her life.

DeMarcus Westwood

DeMarcus Westwood, played by Tomi Ade, made his first appearance on 10 September 2021. The character and casting was announced on 23 August 2021. DeMarcus is the son of Felix Westwood (Richard Blackwood) who arrives in the village to reconnect with his estranged father. The character has been described as headstrong and rebellious and it was noted that he could cause trouble for other teen characters in the village. It has also been teased that DeMarcus may struggle to connect with half-siblings Toby Faroe (Bobby Gordon) and Celeste Faroe (Andrea Ali).

DeMarcus tracks Felix to the village through an app he had installed on his phone, confronting him at Walter Deveraux’s (Trevor A. Toussaint) birthday party. Initially sour, DeMarcus is left feeling guilty after Felix nearly drowns when DeMarcus crashes into his canoe. DeMarcus decides to move in with Felix and his partner, Martine Deveraux (Kéllé Bryan), which DeMarcus' mother Viv (Velile Tshabalala) agrees to.

Speaking about joining the soap, Ade said: "Joining the cast of Hollyoaks has been such an amazing experience. The cast have been so welcoming, and I've just had a blast on set so far. I cannot wait for the fans to meet DeMarcus and see what we have in store for him and his journey in the village!"

Serena Chen-Williams

Serena Chen-Williams, played by Emma Lau, made her first appearance on 23 September 2021. She was introduced to the series as a woman under the alias of Galaxy who meets Sid Sumner (Billy Price) on a night out and ends up in possession of his prosthetic leg. She arranges to meet him the following day, where Sid finds himself attracted to her. The pair kiss before she leaves. Lau was initially contracted on Hollyoaks as a guest star, but in November 2021, it was confirmed that she had been contracted as a series regular. Then in December 2021, she was revealed to be a member of the Chen-Williams, a new family on Hollyoaks and the first East Asian family on a soap opera. Upon her casting announcement, Serena was described as an aspiring olympian who has always been driven and ambitious to succeed in her athletic ventures, but she is now wanting to rebel due to being "torn between living a normal teenage life and focusing on athleticism". Lau knew that she was auditioning for the role of Serena, an athlete, and was surprised to find out that her first scenes as Galaxy involved her stating that she is a singer. However, the producers eventually told her that this was an alter ego that Serena uses to feel confident.

Her first connection in the village is shown to be her step-sister, Lizzie (Lily Best), who she discovers has been dating Sid. Best, who portrays Lizzie, explained that Lizzie is unaware of their romantic history and that discovering it will "hit Lizzie like a ton of bricks" due to her close relationship with Serena. However, Best felt that if Serena wanted to continue a romantic relationship with Sid, her own character would support it. Lau revealed that Serena does still like Sid romantically and that despite trying to suppress them, it does not work. She explained: "It's difficult, because Lizzie really likes Sid. Lizzie isn't just Serena's sister, she's her best friend. So Serena has tried to close that door because it can't happen. Serena has tried to shut down her feelings, but maybe that's not the best thing to do. Suppressing your feelings is never a wise thing to do."

Scenes see Becky Quentin (Katie McGlynn) make sinophobic comments to Serena, which Lau appreciated Hollyoaks for covering. She said that due to sinophobic comments being rampant during the COVID-19 pandemic, it was "a really important issue" for the soap to address. Lau explained that the comments hurt Serena badly, especially due to having experienced racism and xenophobia frequently. She added that the comments and drama with Sid combined could threaten to ruin her enjoyment of Chinese New Year. Another storyline then sees her learn that Dave is the father of Maxine Minniver (Nikki Sanderson). Lau explained that Serena is "a very emotional person" and that she "sees things as very black and white – either something is right or something is wrong". Her personality leads her to initially see Dave bonding with Maxine as a betrayal, especially after she learns that Dave has lied to her for years.

Lexi Calder
D.S. Lexi Calder, played by Natalie Anderson, made her first appearance on 29 October 2021. The character and casting was announced on 19 October 2021. Upon her casting, it was revealed that she would be appearing alongside characters including Grace Black (Tamara Wall), Felix Westwood (Richard Blackwood), Martine Deveraux (Kéllé Bryan) and fellow newcomer Nate Denby (Chris Charles). It was also teased that Lexi's arrival in the village would cause secrets to be unearthed about the Deveraux family. Speaking about her time on the soap, Anderson said: "I'm having so much fun, and everyone at Hollyoaks have been so lovely and welcoming." Upon her arrival, it is revealed that Lexi is a police detective who works with Nate. On 29 September 2022, she was killed by Silas Blissett (Jeff Rawle), making her his last victim before his own death.

Ethan Williams

Ethan Williams, played by Matthew James-Bailey, made his first appearance on 9 November 2021. The character and casting was introduced during the episode as Ethan was revealed to have kidnapped Darren Osborne (Ashley Taylor Dawson). Ethan's role was later expanded as he was revealed to have been working with girlfriend Maya Harkwell (Ky Discala). Speaking about his character, James-Bailey said playing him was "incredibly fun" and teased: "I won't give too much away, but Ethan is here to shake things up and bring a new, albeit 'manic', energy to the village – unfortunately so for Darren. And he won't be the last to have the displeasure of meeting Ethan... Ethan's definitely coming in with a bang." He also recalled being in an episode of Hollyoaks earlier in his career and how he came out of the episode thinking about how he would like to be on the soap long-term, which made his casting a personal success for him.

In an interview with Inside Soaps Alice Penwill, James-Bailey said that playing Ethan is his first experience with playing a villain and that he loves it. He explained that the difference, however, between Ethan being a regular villain is that he is "three-dimensional", and that while he may come across as a "typical bad boy [...] he has a heart". After the death of Maya, Ethan is left with her body to hide. He stores her body in a van belonging to Sienna Blake (Anna Passey) and Ste Hay (Kieron Richardson) and threatens them into burying the body for their van back. However, Ethan learns that Sienna cannot be intimidated by him. On the pair's interactions, James-Bailey told Penwill that there is chemistry between them. He noted that since Ethan had a relationship with Maya, he is shown to have an obvious "thing for very powerful and strong women". Despite Sienna not being intimidated by Ethan, Ste is, which James-Bailey admitted left him feeling nervous from the fan reaction. He explained: "no one's going to be keen on Ethan after this. He becomes quite manipulative with Ste, which for an outsider is sad to see". The actor opined that Ethan's yearn for power comes from being controlled by Maya in their relationship.

On Ethan being the brother of Dave Chen-Williams (Dominic Power), James-Bailey said that Dave cares strongly for Ethan due to having raised him in a brotherly way. He noted that their bond would be hard to break but that it could be threatened by the presence of Dave's wife, Honour (Vera Chok), who does not like Ethan. Power gave James-Bailey advice for how to portray Ethan and noted the similarities between Ethan and his former Emmerdale character, villain Cameron Murray. On his general experience on the soap, James-Bailey stated that he is enjoying the "roller coaster" atmosphere on set and noted that with his initial dark storylines, he was "thrown in at the deep end", which he loved. On the eventuality of appearing alongside other villain Warren Fox (Jamie Lomas), he explained that their scenes are interesting and that it would be exciting to see the characters "go head-to-head" due to Ethan being a modern-day criminal as opposed to Warren, who he felt is "old school" and would "lead with his fists".

Maya Harkwell
Maya Harkwell, played by Ky Discala, made her first appearance on 1 December 2021. The character and casting was announced in the programme's 2021 winter trailer. Maya is the girlfriend of Ethan Williams (Matthew James-Bailey) and is behind the kidnap of Darren Osborne (Ashley Taylor Dawson). Maya is billed as the soap's "new female villain" and as a "femme fatale" with Discala describing her character as "ruthless". During a scuffle with Ethan, Maya is accidentally shot and killed, dying in his arms.

Dave Chen-Williams
Dave Chen-Williams, played by Dominic Power, made his first appearance on 1 December 2021. The character and casting was announced on 23 November 2021. Dave initially appears as outwardly friendly and kind, but it has been teased that he is hiding some dark secrets that could spell trouble for some of the residents. Dave's initial storyline sees him clashing with Theresa McQueen (Jorgie Porter) over a doll's house they are both after. Speaking about joining the soap, Power said: "It's an honour to be part of such an iconic British soap. Can't wait for the Hollyoaks fans to meet Dave."

Dave is later revealed to be a member of the Chen-Williams, a new family on Hollyoaks and the first East Asian family on a soap opera. After his arrival and the introduction, it is revealed that before his marriage to Honour (Vera Chok), Dave was married to another woman. He had married this woman after he abandoned his ex-girlfriend, Trish Minniver (Denise Welch) and it emerges that he is the father of established character Maxine Minniver (Nikki Sanderson).

Honour Chen-Williams
Honour Chen-Williams, played by Vera Chok, made her first appearance on 10 December 2021. The character was announced in the programme's 2021 winter trailer, where it showed Honour as a prison psychiatrist for Warren Fox (Lomas) who attempts to "break down his walls". Chok described being cast in Hollyoaks as a "dream come true"; she said: "As a Malaysian-Chinese first generation immigrant in the UK, the opportunity to play Honour – a fully rounded person with passions, quirks, and flaws – is an amazing milestone for me and also British TV". She also revealed that Honour is chaotic and has lived numerous lifestyles and that her arrival in Hollyoaks village is her "start[ing] life again in yet another new place". Chok found her first scenes on the series thrilling, which included a dramatic scene with Lomas and a confrontational scene with Stephanie Waring and Katie McGlynn). She also hinted that she has filmed joyous scenes but could not reveal more details. Chok also hoped that viewers would love Honour as much as she does. Honour is later revealed to be a member of the Chen-Williams, a new family on Hollyoaks and the first East Asian family on a soap opera.

Sam Chen-Williams
Sam Chen-Williams, played by Matthew McGivern, made his first appearance on 15 December 2021. Sam is a police officer and it was announced upon his casting that he would form a relationship with another character on the soap. This is later revealed to be Celeste Faroe (Andrea Ali), for whom he buys a bottle of champagne. Sam is later revealed to be a member of the Chen-Williams, a new family on Hollyoaks and the first East Asian family on a soap opera.

Lizzie Chen-Williams

Lizzie Chen-Williams, played by Lily Best, made her first appearance on 17 December 2021. The character was announced in the programme's 2021 winter trailer, where she was confirmed to be a new love interest for Sid Sumner (Billy Price). The trailer also showed her having a connection with Serena (Emma Lau), who had previously had a romantic interest in Sid. Later scenes confirmed that she is the stepsister of Serena. The role is Best's first television role following her education at the Italia Conti Academy of Theatre Arts. She described her audition process for Hollyoaks as one of the nicest that she had experienced, noting that it was relaxed and that the casting directors made her feel welcome. The final round of Best's audition process involved her visiting the Hollyoaks studio, which she found daunting. She found the cast and crew to be welcoming, and after she was informed that she had been cast as Lizzie, she cried due to feeling lucky.

Best described Lizzie as "the epitome of bubbly" and said that she "brings a really good energy into the room… unless you annoy her or upset her". When asked if her character has any secrets, Best opined that Lizzie is a fairly open character, but hinted that she has some underlying insecurities which viewers would see when she argues with Serena. Lizzie's debut formed part of the introduction of the Chen-Williams, a new family on Hollyoaks. On being introduced as part of the family, Best said that she felt lucky to be involved, especially due to the Chen-Williams being the first East Asian family on a soap opera. Speaking more about Lizzie's initial connection with Sid, the actress said that she likes Sid a lot due to seeing the real him. Lizzie is also initially unaware that Sid and her stepsister have shared a kiss. On it eventually being revealed to Lizzie, Best said that it would hit her "like a ton of bricks" due to not expecting it at all. However, she noted that despite her feelings for Sid, Lizzie would step aside and support Serena and Sid if they decided to pursue a romantic relationship. When the truth emerges, Sid affirms that he wants to continue his relationship with Lizzie. Best said that she likes Sid and Lizzie together due to their contrasting personalities, with Sid's moodiness and her own character being a "breath of fresh air". They both get jobs at The Dog in the Pond public house, which for Lizzie allows her to be creative and have fun. On the eventuality of more drama hitting her relationship with Sid, Best said that Lizzie would not enjoy the drama but would take it on due to being a "force to be reckoned with".

Mason Chen-Williams
Mason Chen-Williams, played by Frank Kauer, made his first appearance on 23 December 2021. His casting on Hollyoaks was announced on 18 December 2021, where he was revealed to be a member of the Chen-Williams, a new family on Hollyoaks and the first East Asian family on a soap opera. He is the youngest child of Dave (Dominic Power) and Honour (Vera Chok). He was described by producers as a "gentle soul whose attempts to fit in with the cool kids can often be misconstrued by other students". He was also described someone who is quieter than other boys his age that tends to overcompensate whilst attempting to be cool.

Other characters

References

, Hollyoaks
2021
2021 in British television